The European Parliamentary Elections Act 1999 (c.1) is an Act of the Parliament of the United Kingdom.  The Act amended the procedures on European elections in the United Kingdom.  It received Royal Assent on 14 January 1999, after the Parliament Acts 1911 and 1949 had been invoked, as the House of Lords had rejected the bill six times, refusing to accept the change in the electoral system proposed. The Parliament Acts are rarely invoked, the European Parliamentary Elections Act was only the fifth statute since 1911 enacted under their provisions, and only the second since the Parliament Act 1949.

It was passed mainly to change the electoral system used for electing Member of the European Parliament (MEP)s from first past the post to a closed party list system in England, Scotland and Wales. The single transferable vote system was retained in Northern Ireland.  The UK was divided into twelve electoral regions, nine in England (matching the regions of England) and one in Scotland, one in Wales and one in Northern Ireland.  It did not change the number of MEPs elected from the UK.

The act led to a significant increase in the number of MEPs being returned from minor parties in the 1999 European elections, with more Liberal Democrats, along with the first European representatives for Plaid Cymru and the first national representatives for both the Green Party and the United Kingdom Independence Party.

The act was repealed by the European Parliamentary Elections Act 2002.

See also
 European Assembly Elections Act 1978
 European Parliamentary Elections Act 1993
 Elections in the United Kingdom
 List of Acts of the Parliament of the United Kingdom relating to the European Communities (1957-1993) & European Union (1993- )
 List of Acts of the Parliament of the United Kingdom enacted without the House of Lords' consent

References

United Kingdom Acts of Parliament 1999
Acts of the Parliament of the United Kingdom relating to the European Union
European Parliament elections in the United Kingdom
Election law in the United Kingdom
Acts of the Parliament of the United Kingdom passed under the Parliament Act